Stade Sébastien-Charléty, also known as Stade Charléty or Charléty, is a multi-purpose stadium located in the 13th arrondissement of Paris, France. Comprising a running track and a football field, the stadium is a 20,000-seat state-owned venue used for numerous sports and events. It is also the current home ground of the rugby union team of Paris Université Club, who operate the venue, and the association football clubs Paris FC and Paris 13 Atletico.

History 
The stadium opened in 1938 and was designed by French architect Bernard Zehrfuss. In May 1968, Charléty made the news for a nonsporting event: on 27 May, the meeting of the Union Nationale des Étudiants de France, one of the most important of the protests of that month, took place, attracting between 30,000 and 50,000 people. The crowd, led by Pierre Mendès-France and Michel Rocard, shouted "Ce n'est qu'un début, continuons le combat!" ("This is only the beginning; let's keep up the fight!"). 

The stadium has hosted many matches during various Rugby League World Cups. The stadium has an athletic track that hosted the 1994 and 2002 IAAF Grand Prix Final and the 2003 European Youth Summer Olympic Festival. The stadium was scheduled to host the 2020 European Athletics Championships but that event was cancelled because of the COVID-19 pandemic. It served as the temporary home for the Stade Français rugby union club, starting in 2010–11 and running through 2012–13, while that club was building a completely new stadium at the site of its traditional home, Stade Jean-Bouin. It also hosted a Stade Français home match in the Paris derby with Racing Métro in the 2009–10 season.

Arena 
There is an indoor sporting arena called Salle Pierre Charpy that is located under the stadium.  The capacity of the arena is 1,850 people.  It is currently the home arena of the French Pro A League professional volleyball team Paris Volley.

References

External links 

 Stade Sébastien Charlety at the Paris Convention and Visitors Bureau

1939 establishments in France
Athletics (track and field) venues in France
Stade Sébastien-Charléty
Stade Sébastien-Charléty
Football venues in France
Paris FC
Paris Saint-Germain Rugby League
Rugby league stadiums in France
Stade Sébastien-Charléty
Rugby union stadiums in France
Stade Français
Stade Sébastien-Charléty
Sports venues in Paris